The athletics competition at the Islamic Games was held at the İzmir Atatürk Stadium in İzmir, Turkey between 26 September and 6 October 1980. This was the second major athletics event to be staged at the stadium, following the athletics at the 1971 Mediterranean Games. A total of thirty athletics events were contested, twenty-one for men and nine for women. While the men's programme was well attended, the women's events attracted very few entries, with Turkish female track athletes composing the bulk of the competitors. Women's athletics in the Arab world particularly was at an early stage of development – only a year earlier had women's events been introduced at the Arab Athletics Championships and the African Championships in Athletics been launched.

The results of the competition were not of a high international standard, but this was a key purpose of the gathering, as it allowed Muslim nations not traditionally strong in track and field to engage with peers of a similar standard. The host nation Turkey was easily the most dominant in the sport, winning fourteen of the thirty events on offer. Morocco was the next most successful nation, with five golds. Algeria performed well in the distance running events, taking three golds, and Saudi Arabia gave a similar performance in the sprints, also taking three golds. Ten nations made it to the medal table.

Going into the competition, the most prominent athletes were Algeria's Rachid Habchaoui and Turkey's Mehmet Terzi, both of whom had won long-distance running medals at the 1979 Mediterranean Games. Habchaoui took a long-distance track double in the 5000 metres and 10,000 metres, while Terzi was the marathon winner and 10,000 m runner-up. Olympic steeplechase finalist Lahcene Babaci was the winner of his event and, another Algerian, middle-distance running specialist Amar Brahmia was well established, having won multiple medals at the 1978 All-Africa Games. However, it was the efforts of two young athletes who rose to prominence by winning their first major titles here that had the greatest impact on Islamic athletics. Brahmia was beaten in both the 800 metres and 1500 metres by twenty-one-year-old Saïd Aouita, who would later go on to win one of Morocco's first Olympic gold medals, alongside Nawal El Moutawakel, at the 1984 Summer Olympics. Nineteen-year-old Ahmed Hamada Jassim of Bahrain was the other athlete to emerge internationally at this competition: after winning the 400 metres hurdles he went on to be one of Asia's foremost athletes in the event and was the champion at the 1986 Asian Games.

Medal summary

Men

Women

Medal table

References

Medallists
Islamic Games. GBR Athletics. Retrieved on 2015-01-31.

Islamic Games
Islamic Games
Islamic Games Athletics
Islamic Games Athletics
Islamic Games Athletics
Islamic Games
Islamic Games